Moon Hooch is an American band from Brooklyn, New York, known for their dance-oriented percussion- and saxophone-based music. The band is a duo consisting of saxophonists Wenzl McGowen, Michael Wilbur, who tour with a live drummer. The band members met while attending The New School for Jazz and Contemporary Music, and got their start busking in New York City Subway stations.

Their self-titled debut album was released in 2013 and peaked at number 9 on the Billboard Jazz Albums chart. Their second album This Is Cave Music was released on September 16, 2014. and reached number 5 on the Billboard Jazz Albums chart.

History

Early years
The band first started busking in 2010, playing in front of the Metropolitan Museum of Art. The band started out playing mostly jazz, but then moved to dance music after a better audience reception. Later, they decided to busk in the New York City Subway. In the process they were banned from the Bedford Avenue station by the NYPD, who tried to prevent people from dancing on the platform edge. In 2011 they appeared as the house band on the Australian TV series Hamish and Andy's Gap Year where they were re-christened "The Busketeers". Their album artwork is designed by Ari Michael Warner.

2013–2015

After gaining a reputation from busking, Moon Hooch started to release albums, beginning with their self-titled debut on June 25, 2013. It was recorded in a 24-hour period at Bunker Studio in Brooklyn, and most of the copies were sold while the band was still busking. Their second album, This is Cave Music, was released on September 16, 2014 and was the first to use synthesizers, post-production work, and vocals. It received positive reviews, and many reviewers commented on the band's unique style. Their next album, Red Sky, would continue to use the same elements pioneered in This is Cave Music. Moon Hooch has been influential in the “brass house” genre, as well as pushing the boundaries of jazz.

2016–present
The band released their first EP, The Joshua Tree, in early 2017. Their second EP, Light It Up, was released on April 6, 2018, via Hornblow Recordings. The short three track EP was announced alongside the video for the first single of the album, "Acid Mountain."

On November 5th, 2019, Moon Hooch released the single Candlelight, followed by an announcement of the release of their newest album Life On Other Planets.  The album was released in January 2020, and was followed by a large North American tour and a smaller European tour. In February 2021 they released a continuous play album 2021: A Hooch Odyssey, which featured remixes of their favorite songs. On September 9th, 2021 the band released a new album titled Super Cone Bros referencing the character Mario.

Philosophy
The band believes deeply in environmental causes. They are strongly passionate about environmentalism and sustainable living, and use their influence to share this philosophy with others. In 2017, they announced that the band would be carbon neutral. Along with environmental activism, the band is also united in their practice of meditation. They say that it helps to give them focus, something they value in their work. The band also believes that meditation has allowed them to become better people.

Discography

Studio Albums
 Moon Hooch (Hornblow/Palmetto, 2013)
 This Is Cave Music (Hornblow/Palmetto, 2014)
 Red Sky (Hornblow/Palmetto, 2016)
 Life on Other Planets (Self-Released, 2020)
 2021: A Hooch Odyssey (2021)
 Super Cone Bros (Self-Released, 2021)
 My Head & My Heart (2023)
Extended Plays
 Joshua Tree – EP (Hornblow, 2017)
 Light It Up – EP (Hornblow, 2018)

Live albums
 Live at the Cathedral (Hornblow, 2017)
 Live in Nashville (Self-Released, 2020)
Singles
 Mon Santo – Single (Hornblow, 2018)
 Acid Mountain – Single (Hornblow, 2018)
 Moon Hooch & Tonio Sagan – Rise (2019)
 Give Yourself to Love - Single (2019)
 Candlelight  - Single (2019)
 Nonphysical  - Single (2019)

Band members
 Michael Wilbur – tenor saxophone, soprano saxophone, bass saxophone, synthesizers, soprano clarinet, vocals
 Wenzl McGowen – tenor saxophone, baritone saxophone, contrabass clarinet, EWI, synthesizers
 Cyzon Griffin - drums and percussion

Former band members
 James Muschler – drums and percussion, tabla, synthesizers, soprano saxophone

References

External links
 
 
 Official YouTube Channel
 Official Bandcamp

American dance music groups
Musical groups from Brooklyn
American street performers
Palmetto Records artists